Alexander Charles Richards (born 13 September 1971) is an English cricketer.  Richards is a right-handed batsman who bowls right-arm off break.  He was born in Ilford, London.

Richards played for Durham University Cricket Club as a student. He represented the Essex Cricket Board in List A cricket.  His debut List A match came against Ireland in the 1999 NatWest Trophy.  From 1999 to 2003, he represented the Board in 6 List A matches, the last of which came against Essex in the 2003 Cheltenham & Gloucester Trophy.  In his 6 List A matches, he scored 172 runs at a batting average of 28.66, with 2 half centuries and a high score of 64.  In the field he took 4 catches.

References

External links
Alex Richards at Cricinfo
Alex Richards at CricketArchive

1971 births
Living people
People from Ilford
Cricketers from Greater London
English cricketers
Essex Cricket Board cricketers
Alumni of Durham University